Pindi Point (Urdu: پنڈی پوائنٹ ) is a mountain view tourist spot in Murree, Punjab, Pakistan. It has a view of the high mountains and forests of Murree. On Pindi Point, tourists can easily see the cities of Rawalpindi and Islamabad.

Demographics 
Pindi Point is a 15-minute walk from Mall Road, Murree. All of the pedestrian walk is in zigzag formation and covered with tall pine trees. It has a cafe and playgrounds for children.

Pindi Point Chair Lift 
A chair lift has been installed that goes down 1.5 km of Pindi Point.

See also 
 Mai Mari da Ashtan

References

External links 

Mountain view points
Tourist attractions in Murree
Outdoor structures in Pakistan